Adrian Newman is a multi-platinum songwriter/producer

Discography

Singles and albums

Film and Television

Video Games

Other artists Adrian has worked with are:
Michael Franti & Spearhead
Hedley
Plain White Tees
Jesse McCartney
BC Jean
Brandyn Burnette
JMSN
Jackie Evancho
Nikola Bedingfield
Boys Like Girls
Chris Medina
En Vogue
BoA
112
D12
Proof
Horace Brown
The Veronicas
Oceana
Kumi Koda
KAT-TUN
Monrose
Josh Milan
Tenjochiki
No Angels
Natalia
Sabrina Carpenter
Timomatic
Josh Pyke
Samantha Jade
Ricki-Lee
Emma-Louise Birdsall
Elle Winter
Chantelle Paige
Mark Sholtez
Jade Macrae
Gordon Chambers
Priscilla

References

http://www.ascap.com/playback/2013/02/faces-places/pop-rock/ascap-socan-members-nominated-for-juno-awards.aspx
http://www.ascap.com/Playback/2012/09/wecreatemusic/Adrian-Newman-on-Hedley-Kiss-You-Inside-Out.aspx

External links
Official Twitter
Official Website

Australian record producers
Australian songwriters
Living people
Year of birth missing (living people)